The International Workingmen's Association (IWA), often called the First International (1864–1876), was an international organisation which aimed at uniting a variety of different left-wing socialist, communist and anarchist groups and trade unions that were based on the working class and class struggle. It was founded in 1864 in a workmen's meeting held in St. Martin's Hall, London. Its first congress was held in 1866 in Geneva.

In Europe, a period of harsh reaction followed the widespread Revolutions of 1848. The next major phase of revolutionary activity began almost twenty years later with the founding of the IWA in 1864. At its peak, the IWA reported having 8 million members while police reported 5 million. In 1872, it split in two over conflicts between statist and anarchist factions and dissolved in 1876. The Second International was founded in 1889.

Origins 
Following the January Uprising in Poland in 1863, French and British workers started to discuss developing a closer working relationship. Henri Tolain, Joseph Perrachon and Charles Limousin visited London in July 1863, attending a meeting in St. James's Hall in honour of the Polish uprising. They discussed the need for an international organisation, which would amongst other things prevent the import of foreign workers to break strikes. In September 1864, French and British delegates again met in London, this time to set up an organization for sharing labor information across borders.

St. Martin's Hall Meeting, London, 1864 

On 28 September an international crowd of workers gathered to welcome the French delegates in St. Martin’s Hall in London. Among the many European radicals were English Owenites, followers of Pierre-Joseph Proudhon and Louis Auguste Blanqui, Irish and Polish nationalists, Italian republicans and German socialists. Included among the last-mentioned of this eclectic band was a somewhat obscure 46-year-old émigré journalist Karl Marx, who would soon come to play a decisive role in the organisation.

The positivist historian Edward Spencer Beesly, a professor at London University, was in the chair. His speech pilloried the violent proceedings of the governments and referred to their flagrant breaches of international law and advocated a union of the workers of the world for the realisation of justice on earth. George Odger, Secretary of the London Trades Council, read a speech calling for international co-operation.

The meeting unanimously decided to found an international organisation of workers. The centre was to be in London, directed by a committee of 21, which was instructed to draft a programme and constitution. Most of the British members of the committee were drawn from the Universal League for the Material Elevation of the Industrious Classes and were noted trade-union leaders like Odger, George Howell (former secretary of the London Trades Council, which itself declined affiliation to the IWA, although remaining close to it), Cyrenus Osborne Ward and Benjamin Lucraft and included Owenites and Chartists. The French members were Denoual, Victor Le Lubez and Bosquet. Italy was represented by Fontana. Other members were Louis Wolff, Johann Eccarius and at the foot of the list Marx, who participated in his individual capacity and did not speak during the meeting.

This executive committee in turn selected a subcommittee to do the actual writing of the organisational programme—a group which included Marx and which met at his home about a week after the conclusion of the St. Martin's Hall assembly. This subcommittee deferred the task of collective writing in favour of sole authorship by Marx and it was he who ultimately drew up the fundamental documents of the new organisation.

On 5 October, the General Council was formed with co-opted additional members representing other nationalities. It was based at the headquarters of the Universal League for the Material Elevation of the Industrious Classes at 18 Greek Street. Different groups offered proposals for the organisation. Louis Wolff (Mazzini's secretary) offered a proposal based on the rules and constitution of the Italian Workingmen’s Association (a Mazzinist organisation) and John Weston, an Owenite, also tabled a programme. Wolff left for Italy and Lubez rewrote it in a way which appalled Marx. Marx then set about writing the Address to the Working Classes to which was attached a simplified set of rules.

Internal tensions 
At first, the IWA had mostly male membership, although in April 1865 it was agreed that women could become members. The initial leadership was exclusively male. At the IWA General Council meeting on 16 April 1867, a letter from the secularist speaker Harriet Law about women's rights was read and it was agreed to ask her if she would be willing to attend council meetings. On 25 June 1867, Law was admitted to the General Council and for the next five years was the only woman representative.

Due to the wide variety of philosophies present in the First International, there was conflict from the start. The first objections to Marx's influence came from the mutualists, who opposed communism and statism. However, shortly after Mikhail Bakunin and his followers (called collectivists while in the International) joined in 1868, the First International became polarised into two camps, with Marx and Bakunin as their respective figureheads. Perhaps the clearest differences between the groups emerged over their proposed strategies for achieving their visions of socialism. The anarchists grouped around Bakunin favoured (in Peter Kropotkin's words) "direct economical struggle against capitalism, without interfering in the political parliamentary agitation". Marxist thinking at that time focused on parliamentary activity. For example, when the new German Empire of 1871 introduced male suffrage, many German socialists became active in the Marxist Social Democratic Party of Germany.

Geneva Congress, 1866 

During the Geneva Congress, the Paris group of Proudhonians dominated the discussions. Six Blanquists from Paris came to the Congress to denounce the French representatives as emissaries of Napoleon III, but they were thrown out.

A significant decision at this event was the adoption of the eight-hour work day as one of the IWA's fundamental demands.

Lausanne Congress, 1867 

The Lausanne Congress of the International was held on 2–8 September 1867. Marx was unable to attend as he was working on the final proofs of Das Kapital. The Congress was attended by 64 delegates from Great Britain, France, Germany, Belgium, Italy and Switzerland. The reports delivered recorded the increased influence of the International on the working classes in various countries. The Proudhonist delegates, primarily from France, influenced the orientation of the International's activity and its programmatic principles. Despite the efforts of the General Council's delegates, they succeeded in revising the resolutions of the Geneva Congress, passing a number of their resolutions, in particular on cooperation and credit.

The Lausanne Congress confirmed the Geneva Congress resolutions on the economic struggle and strikes and passed a resolution on political freedom which emphasised that the social emancipation of workers was inseparable from political liberation. The Proudhonists also failed to seize the leadership of the International as the Congress re-elected the General Council in its former composition and retained London as its seat.

The Lausanne Congress ignored the General Council's resolution and resolved officially to take part in the Congress of the League of Peace and Freedom. However, this Congress was attended by several General Council and some other International members and failed to resolve its political differences.

Brussels Congress, 1868 

The Brussels Congress of the International in 1868 approved Marx's tactics in regard to the League, opposing official affiliation to the League, but calling upon the working class to combine efforts with all progressive anti-military forces.

Basel Congress, 1869 

The Basel Congress took place on 6–12 September 1869. According to Yuri Mikhailovich Steklov's account:
Seventy-five delegates assembled: from Great Britain, the 6 members of the General Council, Applegarth, Eccarius, Cowell Stepney, Lessner, Lucraft, and Jung; from France, which sent 26 delegates, among whom we may mention Dereure, Landrin, Chémalé, Murat, Aubry, Tolain, A. Richard, Palix, Varlin, and Bakunin: Belgium sent 5 delegates, among whom were Hins, Brismée, and De Paepe; Austria 2 delegates, Neumayer and Oberwinder; Germany sent 10 delegates, among whom were Becker, Liebknecht, Rittinghausen, and Hess; Switzerland had 22 representatives, among whom were Burkly, Greulich, Fritz Robert, Guillaume, Schwitzguébel, and Perret; Italy sent but one delegate, Caporusso; from Spain there came Farga-Pellicer and Sentinon; and the United States of America was represented by Cameron. Jung was elected chairman of the congress.

The conference was mainly noted for the confrontation between the Proudhonist mutualists and the collectivist position, defended by Marx's envoy for the General Council and Bakunin both. However, the Belgian socialist de Paepe played a decisive role in bringing the Belgian delegation across to the collectivist side and isolating the mainly French Proudhonists.

Hague Congress, 1872 

The fifth Congress of the IWA was held in early September 1872 in The Hague, the Netherlands. After the Paris Commune (1871), Bakunin characterised Marx's ideas as authoritarian and argued that if a Marxist party came to power its leaders would end up as bad as the ruling class they had fought against (notably in his Statism and Anarchy). In 1874, Marx wrote some decisive notes rebutting Bakunin's affirmations on this book, referring to them as mere political rhetoric without a theory of the State and without the knowledge about social classes struggles and the economic factor. In 1872, the conflict in the First International climaxed with a final split between the two groups at the Hague Congress. This clash is often cited as the origin of the long-running conflict between anarchists and Marxists.

The Hague Congress was notable for the attempted expulsion of Bakunin and Guillaume and for the decision to relocate the General Council to New York City. The main resolutions passed centred on committing the International to building political parties, aimed at capturing state power as an indispensable condition for socialist transformation.

After 1872: two First Internationals 

From then on, the Marxist and anarchist currents of socialism had distinct organisations, at various points including rival internationals.

This split is sometimes called the "red" and "black" divide, red referring to the Marxists and black referring to the anarchists. Otto von Bismarck remarked upon hearing of the split at the First International that "[c]rowned heads, wealth and privilege may well tremble should ever again the Black and Red unite!".

The anarchist wing of the First International held a separate congress in September 1872 at St. Imier, Switzerland. The anarchists rejected the claim that Bakunin and Guillaume had been expelled and repudiated The Hague Congress as unrepresentative and improperly conducted. Over two days on 15–16 September 1872 at Saint-Imier, the Anarchist St. Imier International declared itself to be the true heir of the International. The Spanish Regional Federation of the IWA formed the largest national chapter of the anarchist bloc.

Bakunin's programme was adopted, Marx was implicitly excluded and the anarchist First International ran until 1877, with some early growth in areas like Egypt and Turkey.

The sixth Congress of the Marxist wing of the International was held in Geneva in September 1873, but it was generally considered to be a failure. The Marxist wing hobbled on until it disbanded three years later at the 1876 Philadelphia conference. Attempts to revive the organisation over the next five years failed.

Since scholarship on the International is heavily shaped by different assessments of the importance and the effects of the Marx–Bakunin conflict, different accounts emphasise different wings of the International and give different dates of its final closure (1876 or 1877).

The Second International was established in 1889 as a successor. Both anarchists and Marxists were involved in the new body in its early years.

The International Working People's Association (the so-called Black International), an anarchist International, appeared in 1881, was mainly influential in the United States and Mexico and gradually disappeared after the late 1880s.

At a congress in Berlin in 1922, the anarcho-syndicalists decided to re-found the First International as the International Workers' Association, from which the International Confederation of Labour split in 2018.

See also 

 Socialist International
 Third International (Comintern)
 Fourth International and Trotskyist internationals
 Fifth International
 International Workers Association
 International Anarchist Congresses
 The Internationale
 Group of Narodnik Socialists

Footnotes

Further reading

Primary sources 

 Marx-Engels-Gesamtausgabe, Akademie-Verlag Berlin, vols. I/20-22: new edition of the minutes of the General Council of the International.
 International Working Men's Association, Resolutions of the Congress of Geneva, 1866, and the Congress of Brussels, 1868. London: Westminster Printing Co., n.d. [1868].
 The General Council of the First International. 1864–1866. The London Conference, 1865. Minutes. Moscow: Foreign Languages Publishing House, 1964.
 The General Council of the First International. 1866–1868. Minutes. Moscow: Progress Publishers, 1964.
 The General Council of the First International. 1868–1870. Minutes. Moscow: Progress Publishers, 1966.
 The General Council of the First International. 1870–1871. Minutes. Moscow: Progress Publishers, 1967.
 The General Council of the First International. 1871–1872. Minutes Moscow: Progress Publishers, 1968.
 The Hague Congress of the First International, September 2–7, 1872. Minutes and Documents. Moscow: Progress Publishers, 1976.
 The Hague Congress of the First International, September 2–7, 1872. Reports and Letters. Moscow: Progress Publishers, 1978.

Secondary sources 

 Samuel Bernstein, "The First International and the Great Powers," Science and Society, vol. 16, no. 3 (Summer 1952), pp. 247–272. In JSTOR.
 Samuel Bernstein, The First International in America. New York: Augustus M. Kelley, 1962.
 Samuel Bernstein, "The First International on the Eve of the Paris Commune," Science and Society, vol. 5, no. 1 (Winter 1941), pp. 24–42. In JSTOR.
 René Berthier, Social-Democracy and Anarchism: In the International Workers Association, 1864–1877. London: Merlin Press, 2015.
 Alex Blonna, Marxism and Anarchist Collectivism in the International Workingman's Association, 1864–1872. M.A. thesis. California State University, Chico, 1977.
 Henry Collins and Chimen Abramsky, Karl Marx and the British Labour Movement: Years of the First International. London: Macmillan, 1965.
 Henryk Katz, The Emancipation of Labor: A History of the First International. Westport, CT: Greenwood Press, 1992.
 Roger Morgan, The German Social Democrats and the First International, 1864–1872. Cambridge, England: Cambridge University Press, 1965.
 G. M. Stekloff, History of the First International. Eden Paul and Cedar Paul (trans.). New York: International Publishers, 1928.

External links 

 History of the International Workingmen's Association at Marxists.org
 Libertarian Communist Library 
 Karl Marx's Inaugural Address of the International Working Men’s Association
 Secret Societies and the First International by Boris Nicolaevsky

 
Far-left politics
History of anarchism
History of socialism
1864 establishments in England
1876 disestablishments in Pennsylvania
Trade unions established in 1864
Trade unions disestablished in the 1870s
Organizations disestablished in 1876
Communist organizations in Europe
International and regional union federations
International Socialist Organisations